Best of the Trilogy ... All the Beauty I Have Lost Forever Will Be Gone is a compilation album  by the Norwegian gothic metal band Mortal Love, released on the German record label Massacre Records on 15 July 2011.

Background 
To the date of release of this album, the ten-year contract signed for the band with Massacre Records was about to expire. Shortly after this, Mortal Love was officially dissolved after five years of inactivity.

The album consists of a selection of the best songs of the three studio albums released by the band between 2002 and 2006.

Track listing 
All tracks composed by Mortal Love.
 Existence - 06:08	  
 Adoration - 06:01	  
 Senses - 03:49	  
 Reality - 08:38	  
 Everything - 03:43	  
 All the Beauty... - 06:13	 
 Crave Your Love - 03:11	
 Beautiful One - 06:10	  
 I Want to Die - 09:51	  
 Mortally Beloved - 05:23	  
 I Make the Mistake - 04:23	  
 My Shadow Self - 03:50	  
 As We Can Not Be One (instrumental) - 01:33

Personnel

Mortal Love 
 Cat (Catherine Nyland) – Female vocals
 Lev  (Hans Olav Kjeljebakken) – Bass, vocals
 Rain6 (Lars Bæk) – Guitars & Programming, vocals
 Damous (Pål Wasa Johansen) – Drums
 Mulciber (Ole Kristian Odden) – Keyboards & Programming
 Gabriah (Ørjan Jacobsen) – Guitar

Session musicians
 Zet (Henning Ramseth)  – Additional Guitar and vocals in  "Everything" and "I Make the Mistake"

Additional notes 
Phonographic Copyright  – Mystic Empire
Manufactured By – Мистик Импайр
Licensed From – Massacre Records
Recorded At – Space Valley Studio
Mixed At – The Red Room
Mastered At – The Red Room
Layout [Cover Layout], Design – Katja Piolka
Mixed By, Mastered By – Andy Horn 
Photography By – www.everainmedia.com
Producer – Lev, Rain6, Zet

References

External links 
Spirit of Metal
Encyclopedia Metallum entry

2011 compilation albums
Massacre Records albums
Mortal Love albums